'Eastbourne' is a former village in the borough of Darlington and the ceremonial county of County Durham, England. It is situated immediately to the east of the town centre of Darlington of which it is now an area.

References

Suburbs of Darlington